Belmont is a community in the Canadian province of Nova Scotia, located in  Colchester County. Prior to 1872 it was called "Chiganois", the name taken from the nearby river. It was part of the Onslow Township that received New England Planters in the 1760s after the expulsion of the Acadians.

References
 Belmont on Destination Nova Scotia
 Colchester County Communities

Communities in Colchester County
General Service Areas in Nova Scotia